John Legg may refer to:

 John Legg (politician) (born 1975), American politician in Florida
 John Legg (ornithologist) (1765–1802), amateur ornithologist
 John Legg (footballer), New Zealand football player
 John Wickham Legg (1843–1921), English physician and theologian
 John Legg (writer) (born 1972), writer